Newman Wright Hoyles (1777–1840) was an English businessman and politician.

Hoyles was born in Dartmouth, England, and he became involved in the Newfoundland fish trade after being a fishing captain for many years. In 1811, he formed a partnership with his brother-in-law and dealt with business along the Southern Shore and Conception Bay.

Hoyles retired from business in 1831 and entered politics in 1832, running for House of Assembly. He was a strong supporter of the local legislature, but difference between him and the reform movement caused Hoyles to become leader of the Conservative faction expressing the interest of the mercantile sector which was disillusioned with the growing power of the Roman Catholic bishop, Michael Anthony Fleming.

Hoyles was appointed Colonial Treasurer in 1833 and kept that position until he died in 1840, even though he never ran for re-election in 1836.

Hoyles son, Hugh W. Hoyles, became the third Premier of Newfoundland Colony.

References 

 
 

1777 births
1840 deaths
Newfoundland Colony people
People from Dartmouth, Devon